CFRG may refer to:

Radio call signs
one of two radio stations in Gravelbourg, Saskatchewan, Canada:

 CFRG (AM), a defunct AM radio station that was affiliated with the Première Chaîne network,
 CFRG-FM, an active FM community radio station.

Despite the shared call sign, the stations never had common ownership.

Cryptography

CFRG may also refer to the Crypto Forum Research Group of the Internet Research Task Force (IRTF)